The Roberts House is a historic Tudor Revival style residence and two dependencies in Mobile, Alabama, United States.  Built in the 1920s upper-class suburb of County Club Estates, the complex was designed by J. F. Pate. The rambling two-story red brick mansion was completed in 1929.  The exterior architecture features steeply pitched gables, prominent chimneys, casement windows, and an elaborate Tudor arch door surround.

Purchased by the John A. Roberts Jr. family in 1988, it was subsequently placed on the National Register of Historic Places on July 29, 1994.  It was sold to Dr. Charles F. and Janice M. Jones in 2001.

References

American upper class
National Register of Historic Places in Mobile, Alabama
Houses on the National Register of Historic Places in Alabama
Houses in Mobile, Alabama
Houses completed in 1929
Tudor Revival architecture in Alabama